Yalho, Yahlo is an ancient town located in the eastern Bari region of Puntland, Somalia, about  south of Bosaso. The town forms part of Bosaso district local government.

Demography
The residents of Yalho mostly hail the sub-clans of Dishiishe, Darod.

References

Populated places in Bari, Somalia
Bosaso